Călin Târnăvean (born 3 January 1984 in Târgu Mureș) is a Romanian former footballer.

See also
Football in Romania

Notes

External links

1984 births
Living people
ACF Gloria Bistrița players
ASA 2013 Târgu Mureș players
CSM Deva players
Romanian footballers
Association football forwards
Sportspeople from Târgu Mureș